Boriziny (French: Port-Bergé) is a city (commune urbaine) in western Madagascar in Sofia Region.

Geography
It is situated at the Route nationale 6 near the bay of Helodrano.
The Bemarivo flows near Port Bergé, just before flowing into the Anjobony and the Sofia River.

An airport serves the town.

Religion
It is the seat of the Roman Catholic Diocese of Boriziny (Cathedral of Our Lady of Assumption).

Agriculture
Port Bergé (Boriziny) is one of the few regions where tobacco is grown in Madagascar.

Sports
TAM Port Bergé (football)

Protected areas
The Bongolava Forest Corridor that covers 60.701 ha in the area between Port Bergé and Mampikony.

References

Cities in Madagascar
Populated places in Sofia Region
Tobacco in Madagascar